The Venerable  Henry Lucas Cook was Archdeacon of Craven from 1913 to 1928.

Cook was educated at The King's School, Canterbury and Brasenose College, Oxford. After a curacy at All Saints, Bradford, he held incumbencies at St Mark's, Low Moor and Skipton before his years as an Archdeacon.

He died on 16 May 1928.

References

People educated at The King's School, Canterbury
Alumni of Brasenose College, Oxford
Archdeacons of Craven
1928 deaths
Year of birth missing